The River Wye is a limestone river in the Peak District of Derbyshire, England.  It is 22 miles long (widely but incorrectly attributed as 15 miles/24 km, which refers to the section within the National Park), and is one of the major tributaries of the River Derwent, which flows into the River Trent, and ultimately into the Humber and the North Sea.

The river rises just west of Buxton, on Axe Edge Moor. Part of the flow passes underground through Poole's Cavern before rising  at Wye Head, and flowing through the Pavilion Gardens in Buxton. It then flows east through the dales of the Wye Valley, along a route roughly followed by the A6 road.  It enters the Peak District, flows just south of Tideswell, then through Ashford in the Water and Bakewell, and south of Haddon Hall, before meeting the River Derwent at Rowsley.

The main tributary of the river is the River Lathkill, which enters approximately one mile from its mouth.

The River Wye is one of Derbyshire's best-known rivers and is popular with anglers because of the large numbers of wild brown, rainbow trout and grayling it contains.  The alkalinity of the Wye provides a rich source of nutrients that leads to an abundance of insects, invertebrates and other wildlife. This ensures that the trout and grayling grow quickly on a diet of freshwater shrimp, caddisfly (also known as sedge-flies) and mayfly (to name but a few of the foods available). Some of the largest populations of water voles in Britain can also be found along the River Wye.

It is possible to walk alongside much of the length of the river, mostly following a former railway line, part of which is now the Monsal Trail and provides views of the river. In Monsal Dale the former railway line emerges from a tunnel at Monsal Head, over a viaduct high above the river below. When this structure was built John Ruskin was enraged, and spoke of the Gods being banished by a scheme intended to convey "every Buxton fool to Bakewell in half an hour" and vice versa, "and you call this lucrative exchange—you fools everywhere". The railway is now closed, but the viaduct is itself a listed structure.

See also
Rivers of the United Kingdom
List of rivers of England

Notes and references

Rivers and valleys of the Peak District
Rivers of Derbyshire
1Wye